Katrina Adams and Manon Bollegraf were the defending champions but they competed with different partners that year, Adams with Zina Garrison-Jackson and Bollegraf with Martina Navratilova.

Adams and Garrison-Jackson lost in the final 6–4, 6–2 against Bollegraf and Navratilova.

Seeds
Champion seeds are indicated in bold text while text in italics indicates the round in which those seeds were eliminated.

 Manon Bollegraf /  Martina Navratilova (champions)
 Katrina Adams /  Zina Garrison-Jackson (final)
 Sandra Cecchini /  Patricia Tarabini (semifinals)
 Magdalena Maleeva /  Conchita Martínez (quarterfinals)

Draw

External links
 1994 Virginia Slims of Houston Doubles Draw

Virginia Slims of Houston
1994 WTA Tour